Zodarion andalusiacum is a spider species found in Portugal and Spain.

See also
 List of Zodariidae species

References

External links

andalusiacum
Spiders of Europe
Spiders described in 1991